Andrew Whyte Smith (6 February 1849 – 18 July 1901) was a Canadian amateur golfer. He finished tied for third place in the 1895 U.S. Open played at Newport Golf Club in Rhode Island and had an identical result in the 1896 U.S. Open, held July 18, 1896, at Shinnecock Hills Golf Club in Southampton, New York.

Early life
Smith was born and educated in St Andrews, Scotland. He came into his own as a golfer in his early 20s, playing with contemporaries such as Young Tom Morris and Davie Strath in St Andrews Rose Golf Club competitions.

In 1873 he moved to Glasgow, winning the Spring Meeting and Scratch Medal of the Glasgow Golf Club where he acted as Assistant Secretary.

In 1880, before leaving Glasgow Golf Club, Smith was the first winner of the Tennant Cup, believed to be the second oldest amateur stroke-play competition in the world.

He emigrated to Canada in 1881, in order to work at the Quebec Bank and immediately joined the Royal Quebec Golf Club.  In 1882 he relocated to Toronto where he joined the Toronto Golf Club.  According to golf historian James Barclay, he assumed the status as the premiere golfer in Ontario.

Golf career

1879 Open Championship
Smith returned to his hometown of St Andrews to play in The Open Championship in 1879. He tied for 27th with a score of 190 and was leading amateur.

1895 U.S. Open 
The 1895 U.S. Open was the first U.S. Open, held on Friday, October 4, at Newport Golf Club in Newport, Rhode Island. Horace Rawlins won the inaugural U.S. Open title, two strokes ahead of runner-up Willie Dunn. Canadian amateur Andrew Smith, who carded rounds of 90-86=176, finished tied for third place.

1896 U.S. Open
Smith, the Canadian amateur player, scored well on the Shinnecok Hills course. His rounds of 78-80=158 put him in a tie for third place. He did not win any prize money due to his amateur status.

Details of play
The 1896 U.S. Open was held July 18 at Shinnecock Hills Golf Club in Southampton, New York. James Foulis won his first U.S. Open title, three strokes ahead of runner-up Horace Rawlins, the defending champion. Like the first Open, it was a sideshow to the U.S. Amateur. However, there were 35 entrants and 28 finished the 36 holes.

Before play began, several players signed a petition stating that they would not play if John Shippen, an African-American, and Oscar Bunn, a Native American, were allowed to play. The petition was denied, however, and the players relented. Shippen, a caddie at Shinnecock Hills, shot an opening round of 78, which placed him just two back of leader Joe Lloyd. He was in a position to win the championship until an 11 on the 13th hole of the final round. He finished tied for 6th place. James Foulis, third-place finisher in the inaugural U.S. Open the year before, recorded rounds of 78-74 to prevail by three over defending champion Horace Rawlins. Foulis's 74 set a record that was not broken until 1903, after the rubber-core ball had come into use.

At , Shinnecock Hills played as the shortest course in U.S. Open history. Its next U.S. Open was 90 years later, in 1986, when Raymond Floyd won his fourth and final major.

1897 Open Championship
During a return home to Scotland in 1897, Smith (aged 49) entered The Open Championship at Hoylake. He tied for 49th place with a total of 365.

Death and legacy
Smith died in Toronto on 18 July 1901 and is buried in Strathroy, Middlesex, Ontario. He is remembered as a leading amateur player in North America and for having two top-3 finishes in the U.S. Open, in 1895 and again in 1896.

Results in major championships

Note: Smith played only in the U.S. Open Championship.

"T" indicates a tie for a place
? = Unknown
Yellow background for top-10

References

Canadian male golfers
Amateur golfers
Golfers from St Andrews
Golfers from Toronto
1849 births
1901 deaths